The 1939 Arkansas Razorbacks football team represented the University of Arkansas in the Southwest Conference (SWC) during the 1939 college football season. In their 11th year under head coach Fred Thomsen, the Razorbacks compiled a 4–5–1 record (2–3–1 against SWC opponents), finished in fifth place in the SWC, and were outscored by their opponents by a combined total of 117 to 115.

Schedule

References

Arkansas
Arkansas Razorbacks football seasons
Arkansas Razorbacks football